Julia Coons Henderson (April 22, 1862 – March 15, 1922) was an American suffragist, secretary of the Women's Franchise League of Indiana from 1912 to 1917. She was also assistant national secretary of the War Mothers of America.

Early life 
Julia Coons was from Crawfordsville, Indiana, the daughter of John R. Coons and Nancy Carolina Graham Coons.

Career 
Julia Coons was a teacher as a young woman. As Julia C. Henderson, she was treasurer of the Women's School League of Indianapolis in 1909, and secretary when the organization became the Women's Franchise League of Indiana from 1912 to 1917. She was a leader of women's relief organizations in Indiana during World War I, and organized a speaker bureau for delivering wartime information and fundraising messages to women's groups. She was assistant secretary of the War Mothers of America after World War I, and started the organization's publication, The Service Star. After the war and the suffrage campaign, she continued active in Indiana politics and in the Indianapolis chapter of the League of Women Voters.

Personal life 
Julia Coons married George M. Henderson in 1884. They had a son, Edwin, born in 1890. She died suddenly in 1922, aged 59 years, in Indianapolis.

References 

1862 births
1922 deaths
American suffragists
American women in World War I
People from Crawfordsville, Indiana